is a law professor, President of Hakuoh University, former President of Waseda University, the 10th and present Chief Scout of the Scout Association of Japan since April 1, 2010, and served as the Camp Chief of the 23rd World Scout Jamboree.

In addition, Okushima was the Japan High School Baseball Federation (JHBF) President and Japan Student Baseball Association (JSBA) Director, and serves as Member at-large of the Baseball Federation of Japan.

References

|-

|-

|-

External links

Scouting in Japan
Living people
Waseda University alumni
1939 births
Chief Scouts